Oropesa District may refer to:

Oropesa District, Antabamba, Peru
Oropesa District, Quispicanchi, Peru

See also
Oropeza Province, Bolivia